George William "Rube" Ellis (November 17, 1885 – March 13, 1938), was a professional baseball player who played outfielder in the Major Leagues from -. Ellis played for the St. Louis Cardinals. In both 1909 and 1910, Ellis led all National League left fielders in assists.

External links

1885 births
1938 deaths
Major League Baseball outfielders
Baseball players from California
St. Louis Cardinals players
Minor league baseball managers
Los Angeles Angels (minor league) players
San Francisco Seals (baseball) players
Vernon Tigers players
Burlington Bees players
Sportspeople from Downey, California

 Rube Ellis at SABR (Baseball BioProject)